Beckermann is a German surname. Notable people with the surname include:

Ansgar Beckermann (born 1945), German analytic philosopher and professor at the University of Bielefeld
Christoph Beckermann (born 1960), German mechanical engineer and professor at the University of Iowa
Ruth Beckermann (born 1952), Austrian film producer

See also
Beckerman

German-language surnames